FlyOne Armenia LLC, styled as FlyOne Armenia, is an Armenian low-cost airline based in Yerevan, Armenia. It is a subsidiary of the Moldovan low-cost airline FlyOne.

History
The airline was created following a 60 million euro ($67.8 million) investment by Moldovan airline FlyOne. The airline was granted its Air Operator's Certificate on 29 October 2021 and began operations on 18 December 2021 with a direct flight to Lyon. In late 2021, Chairman of FlyOne, Vladimir Cebotari, said that the airline was negotiating the lease of three A321-200s in total, including the units assigned to the new Armenian carrier.

Destinations

Fleet

Current fleet 
As of February 2023, the FlyOne Armenia fleet includes the following aircraft:

See also
 List of airlines of Armenia
 List of airports in Armenia
 List of the busiest airports in Armenia
 Transport in Armenia

References

External links
 FlyOne Armenia on Facebook

Airlines of Armenia
Airlines established in 2021
Low-cost carriers